Saturn or Saturn Devouring His Son is a 1636 painting by the Flemish artist Peter Paul Rubens, now in the Museo del Prado, in Madrid.

It was commissioned for the Torre de la Parada by Philip IV of Spain and shows the influence of Michelangelo on Rubens, which he had picked up on his journey to Italy. The three stars at the top of the painting represent the planet Saturn as described by Galileo a few years before its painting. The central star is the planet itself, whilst the two others represent what he thought were two stars aligned with the planet. In reality, these were the rings around the planet, which his telescope was not powerful enough to distinguish.

References

1636 paintings
Paintings by Peter Paul Rubens in the Museo del Prado
Paintings of Roman gods
Paintings about death
Saturn (mythology) in culture
Paintings of children
Mythological paintings by Peter Paul Rubens